John Coxford (25 July 1901 – 1978) was an English professional footballer who played in the Football League for Sunderland, Birmingham and Bournemouth & Boscombe Athletic. He played as a centre half.

Life and career
Coxford was born in North Seaton, Ashington, Northumberland. He played for North Seaton Colliery and Stakeford United before joining Sunderland in 1924. He made his debut in the First Division on 18 April 1925, in a 1–1 draw at Blackburn Rovers, but never established himself as a first-team player. In April 1927, after only 11 games for Sunderland, Coxford joined fellow First Division club Birmingham. He was signed as cover for George Morrall, but the developing Tom Fillingham pushed Coxford down the pecking order, and after three years with the club in which he played only 16 games, he left for Bournemouth & Boscombe Athletic of the Third Division South. At Bournemouth, Coxford had four seasons of regular first-team football. Towards the end of the 1933–34 season, he played two games for nearby Poole Town before moving on to Northfleet United as player-coach.

Northfleet United acted as a nursery club for Tottenham Hotspur. Wales and Tottenham player Ron Burgess described in his autobiography how  Coxford went on to join the training staff at Tottenham, working under Cecil Poynton, with particular responsibility for the reserve team.

Coxford died in Bury St Edmunds, Suffolk, in 1978 aged about 77.

References

1901 births
1978 deaths
Sportspeople from Ashington
Footballers from Northumberland
English footballers
Association football defenders
Sunderland A.F.C. players
Birmingham City F.C. players
AFC Bournemouth players
Poole Town F.C. players
Northfleet United F.C. players
English Football League players
Tottenham Hotspur F.C. non-playing staff
Date of death missing